William B. Poole (1833–1904) was an American sailor who received the Medal of Honor for valor in action during the American Civil War.

Poole was born in Maine in 1833. He was awarded his Medal of Honor for gallantry under fire exhibited while steering the ship.

Poole died in 1904 and is buried in Pine Grove Cemetery in Lynn, Massachusetts. Fellow Civil War Medal of Honor recipient John G. B. Adams is buried in the same cemetery.

Medal of Honor citation
Rank and organization: Quartermaster, U.S. Navy. Born: 1833 Maine. Accredited to: Maine. G.O. No.: 45, December 31, 1864.

Citation:

Service as quartermaster on board the U.S.S. Kearsarge when she destroyed the Alabama off Cherbourg, France, 19 June 1864. Stationed at the helm, Poole steered the ship during the engagement in a cool and most creditable manner and was highly commended by his divisional officer for his gallantry under fire.

See also

List of Medal of Honor recipients
List of American Civil War Medal of Honor recipients: M–P

References

External links

1833 births
1904 deaths
Union Navy sailors
United States Navy Medal of Honor recipients
American Civil War recipients of the Medal of Honor